James McAulay (28 August 1860 – 13 January 1943) was a Scottish footballer.

Career
McAulay played for Dumbarton and Scotland.

Honours
Dumbarton
- Scottish Cup: Winners 1882–83 - Runners Up 1886–87
- Dumbartonshire Cup: Winners 1884–85
- Glasgow Charity Cup: Runners-Up 1881–82;1884–85
- 9 caps for Scotland between 1881 and 1887, scoring 1 goal *
- 5 representative caps for Dumbartonshire
- 4 representative caps for Scotch Counties
- 8 international trial matches for Scotland between 1881 and 1887.

 - McAulay played for Scotland as a goalkeeper in most of his international appearances, but also played as a forward.

See also
List of Scotland national football team captains

References

External links

London Hearts profile
James McAulay (The Sons Archive - Dumbarton Football Club History)

1860 births
1943 deaths
Scottish footballers
Scotland international footballers
Dumbarton F.C. players
Association football goalkeepers
Association football forwards
Place of death missing
People from Bonhill
Footballers from West Dunbartonshire